Club Deportivo Olimpia Occidental is a Honduran soccer club based in La Entrada, Honduras.

They play their home games at the Estadio Alsacias.

History
The club currently plays in the Honduran second division, making their debut in the 2011 Clausura. They saved themselves from the drop in summer 2013 after beating Sonaguera FC in a relegation play-off.

Squad

References

Football clubs in Honduras